Bukharian (autonym: Bukhori, Hebrew script: בוכארי, Cyrillic: бухорӣ, Latin: Buxorī) is a Judeo-Persian dialect historically spoken by the Bukharan Jews of Central Asia. It is a Jewish dialect derived from —and largely mutually intelligible with— the Tajik branch of the Persian language.

General information 

Historically, Bukharian was spoken by Jews in Central Asia. The language classification of Bukharian is as follows: Indo-European > Indo-Iranian > Iranian > West Iranian > Southwest Iranian > Persian > Tajik > Bukharian.

Bukhori is based on Classical Persian, with a large number of Hebrew loanwords, as well as smaller numbers of loanwords from other surrounding languages, including Uzbek and Russian. The vocabulary includes lexical items of Persian, Arabic, Uzbek, and Hebrew origin.

In 1987, the total number of speakers was 85,000. In the USSR, there were 45,000 speakers; in Israel, there were 32,000; and in all other countries combined, there were 3,000. Ethnic Tajik minorities exist in many countries, such as Afghanistan, Pakistan, and Uzbekistan. Samarkand and Bukhara are two cities in Uzbekistan which are particularly densely populated by Tajik speakers, among whom were tens of thousands of Bukharan Jews in the 19th to 20th centuries. (In modern times, the dialects spoken by the few remaining Jews in these cities barely differ, if at all, from their non-Jewish counterparts.)

Today, the language is spoken by approximately 10,000 Jews remaining in Uzbekistan and surrounding areas, although most of its speakers reside elsewhere, predominantly in Israel (approximately 50,000 speakers), and the United States.

Like most Jewish languages, Bukhori traditionally used the Hebrew alphabet. But throughout the past century, due to Soviet influence, Bukhori has been written in Latin in the 1920s, then Cyrillic from 1940 onwards. The Hebrew alphabet fell further into disuse outside of Hebrew liturgy when the Bukharian Jewish schools were closed in Central Asia and Bukharian Jewish publications, such as books and newspapers, began to appear using the Cyrillic alphabet. Today, many older Bukharian Jews who speak Bukharian only know the Cyrillic alphabet when reading and writing Bukharian. The origin of its respective spelling system is Talmudic orthography.

During the Soviet period, communists wanted Hebrew to be the language of culture and instruction in the Republic of Turkestan and in the Bukhara People's Soviet Republic. In late 1921, the Turkestani People's Commissariat of Education ordered that schools for Bukharan Jews to teach in Bukharian and not in Hebrew. In Uzbekistan in 1934, 15 Bukharan Jewish clubs and 28 Bukharan Jewish red teahouses existed. However, in 1938, Bukharian was no longer used as the language for instruction in the schools and in cultural activities.

Attempts were made to bring back Bukharan Jewish culture in the Soviet Union. One significant attempt was the establishment of a council for Bukharan Jewish literature in the Uzbekistan Writers’ Union, it was headed by Aharon Shalamaev-Fidoi (Shalamaev-Fidoi left for Israel in 1991). Another significant attempt was the Hoverim society established in Tajikistan and headed by Professor Datkhaev (Datkhaev left for the US in 1992). The organization that continues to support the Bukharan Jewish culture today is the World Bukharian Jewish Congress. This organization is introducing to the public the unique story of the Bukharan Jews. Its goal is for others to learn about the history of the Bukharan Jews, as well as their culture, language and literature. Based on the Soviet census of 1979, 20% more of Central Asian Jews spoke Russian instead of Bukharian.

Among some Bukharian Jewish youth, especially in the New York City area, there has been a revival of using the Bukharian Jewish language written in a modified Latin alphabet similar to the one developed by Bukharian Jewish linguist and writer, Yakub Kalontarov. Today, youths learning the Bukharian Jewish language sponsored by the Achdut-Unity Club in Queens use the modified Latin alphabet.

Classes on Bukharian Jewish history and the Bukhori language are also available at Queens College, CUNY since 2010, marking the first time that Bukhori has been taught in an American university. The classes are taught by Bukharian adjunct professor Imanuel Rybakov.

See also
Emirate of Bukhara
Judeo-Tat

References

External links

 Learn Basic Bukhori
Endangered Languages Project
Noni padar (Father's bread)
MULOQAND
Music Examples
More Music Examples
Bukharian Poem
Grisha Abramov Bukharian Jews Miami speech in Bukhoric Bukharan
Torah Lectures in Bukharian Language

Notes

 
Jews and Judaism in Uzbekistan
Dialects of Tajik
Languages of Uzbekistan
Endangered Indo-European languages